Julian Emil-Jamaal Wright (born May 20, 1987) is an American professional basketball player. He played college basketball for the University of Kansas. In 2014–15, he was the top rebounder in the Israel Basketball Premier League.

High school career
Julian Wright played competitive basketball at Homewood-Flossmoor High School in Flossmoor, Illinois. There he led the Vikings to second place in the IHSA state AA tournament his junior year, losing to Peoria Central in the championship game, who were led by future NBA player Shaun Livingston. In 2005, he was selected to the McDonald's All-American team, and he was rated among the top ten basketball players in his class by several recruiting services) due to his talent and versatility.

College career
Wright entered the 2005–2006 NCAA season for the Kansas Jayhawks as the pre-season freshman of the year in the Big 12 Conference. Though he did not start at the beginning of the season, he quickly played his way into the starting power forward slot. His superior athleticism often allowed him to score baskets simply by virtue of his beating the defense down the court. A highlight of his freshman campaign may have been against the University of Texas in the Big 12 Tournament Championship game when he put an exclamation mark on KU's win with two magnificent breakaway slam dunks in the closing minutes of the game. During his freshman season, Wright averaged 8.5 points per game, but he was praised more for his ability to help his team without scoring. He was named to the All-Big 12 tournament Team and the All-Big 12 Freshman Team along with fellow Kansas freshmen Brandon Rush and Mario Chalmers. During the 2007 tournament, he was again placed on the All-Tournament Team. Wright garnered national attention for a 33-point performance against the Missouri Tigers.

For his play during the 2006–2007 season, Wright was named a third team All-American by the National Association of Basketball Coaches' All-America Team.

Despite statements to the contrary, on Monday, April 9, 2007, Wright announced that he was making himself eligible for the NBA draft. He hired an agent, making him ineligible to return to school prior to the draft.

Professional career
Wright was selected as the 13th overall selection in the 2007 NBA draft by the New Orleans Hornets.  In his rookie season in the NBA, Wright averaged 3.9 points per game and 2.1 rebounds per game. On October 26, 2009 the Hornets picked up the option on Wright's contract for the 2010–11 season.

On August 11, 2010, Wright was traded to the Toronto Raptors for Marco Belinelli.

Wright signed with the Austin Toros of the NBA D-League in February 2012.

In October 2012, Wright signed with Maccabi Rishon LeZion of Israel.

In September 2013, he signed with Krasnye Krylia of the VTB United League.

On October 16, 2014, he signed with Panathinaikos of the Greek League. On December 31, 2014, Panathinaikos decided to terminate his contract.

On January 9, 2015 he signed with Bnei Herzliya of the Israeli Premier League for the rest of the season. In 2014–15, he was the top rebounder in the Israel Basketball Premier League.

On June 8, he signed with Cangrejeros de Santurce of Puerto Rico for the rest of the 2015 BSN season.

On August 4, 2015, Wright joined Italian Serie A side Dolomiti Energia Trento for the 2015–16 season.

On July 17, 2016, Wright signed with Turkish club Trabzonspor. On May 1, 2017, he parted ways with Trabzonspor after averaging 13.3 points, 7.7 rebounds and 2.9 assists per game. Three days later, he signed with Italian club Pallacanestro Reggiana for the rest of the 2016–17 Lega Basket Serie A season.

On September 21, 2017, Pallacanestro Reggiana announced the return of Wright.

On August 30, 2018, Wright signed with Levallois Metropolitans in France. However, in February 2019, Wright left Levallois after a dispute with the team. He later posted a video on Linkedin explaining the situation.

On September 29, 2020, Wright signed with the Hsinchu Lioneers of the P.League.

On December 21, 2021, Wright signed with the Taichung Wagor Suns of the T1 League.

One May 25, 2022, Wright was drafted by 3's Company as the fifth overall pick in the 2022 BIG3 draft.

NBA career statistics

Regular season 

|-
| align="left" | 
| align="left" | New Orleans
| 57 || 1 || 11.2 || .533 || .417 || .635 || 2.1 || .7 || .5 || .2 || 3.9
|-
| align="left" | 
| align="left" | New Orleans
| 54 || 19 || 14.3 || .466 || .095 || .567 || 2.8 || .8 || .6 || .4 || 4.4
|-
| align="left" | 
| align="left" | New Orleans
| 68 || 14 || 12.8 || .500 || .333 || .610 || 2.1 || .6 || .4 || .3 || 3.8
|-
| align="left" | 
| align="left" | Toronto
| 52 || 6 || 14.7 || .512 || .200 || .512 || 2.3 || 1.1 || .8 || .4 || 3.6
|- class="sortbottom"
| style="text-align:center;" colspan="2"| Career
| 231 || 40 || 13.2 || .499 || .262 || .584 || 2.3 || .8 || .6 || .3 || 3.9

Playoffs 

|-
| align="left" | 2008
| align="left" | New Orleans
| 11 || 0 || 11.9 || .455 || .222 || .833 || 1.6 || .5 || .9 || .1 || 4.3
|-
| align="left" | 2009
| align="left" | New Orleans
| 4 || 0 || 8.0 || .429 || .000 || .500 || 1.5 || .5 || .0 || .3 || 2.0
|- class="sortbottom"
| style="text-align:center;" colspan="2"| Career
| 15 || 0 || 10.9 || .451 || .222 || .700 || 1.6 || .5 || .7 || .1 || 3.7

Personal life
His hometown is Chicago Heights, Illinois and he attended Homewood-Flossmoor High School class of 2005.

Wright is a bowling hobbyist, and was described by the Kansas City Star as having bowled at the University of Kansas's Jay Bowl "at least one night a week". He owns both a bowling ball and bowling shoes, the latter of which are KU's blue and crimson colors.

Awards and Highlights
High School
 McDonald's All-American (2005)
 Illinois Mr. Basketball (2005)
NBA
 Led 2008 NBA Playoffs in Steal Pct.

References

External links
eurobasket.com profile
FIBA profile
Kansas Jayhawks bio

1987 births
Living people
21st-century African-American sportspeople
African-American basketball players
All-American college men's basketball players
American expatriate basketball people in Canada
American expatriate basketball people in Israel
American expatriate basketball people in Italy
American expatriate basketball people in Russia
American expatriate basketball people in Turkey
American men's basketball players
Aquila Basket Trento players
Austin Toros players
Basketball players from Chicago
BC Krasnye Krylia players
Big3 players
Cangrejeros de Santurce basketball players
Homewood-Flossmoor High School alumni
Kansas Jayhawks men's basketball players
Maccabi Rishon LeZion basketball players
McDonald's High School All-Americans
Metropolitans 92 players
New Orleans Hornets draft picks
New Orleans Hornets players
Pallacanestro Reggiana players
Panathinaikos B.C. players
Parade High School All-Americans (boys' basketball)
People from Chicago Heights, Illinois
Power forwards (basketball)
Small forwards
Sportspeople from Cook County, Illinois
Toronto Raptors players
Trabzonspor B.K. players
20th-century African-American people
American men's 3x3 basketball players
American expatriate basketball people in Taiwan
Hsinchu JKO Lioneers players
Taichung Wagor Suns players
T1 League imports
P. League+ imports